Guest of Honour is a 1934 British comedy film directed by George King and starring Henry Kendall, Miki Hood, Edward Chapman and Joan Playfair. In the film, an aristocrat unmasks a blackmailer. It is based on F. Anstey's 1903 play The Man from Blankley's which had been made as a 1920 Paramount silent The Fourteenth Man and the 1930 John Barrymore talkie The Man from Blankley's.

References

1934 comedy films
1934 films
British black-and-white films
British comedy films
1930s English-language films
1930s British films